Ruby Peak is a thirteener on the Sierra Crest, north of Mount Mills. It is in the John Muir Wilderness and on the boundary between the Sierra National Forest and the Inyo National Forest. It is near Mono Pass. The eastern slope drains into Rock Creek which feeds the Owens River while the western slopes drains in Mono Creek which feeds the South Fork of the San Joaquin River.

Climbing
The peak's first ascent was prior to 1934 by Norman Clyde via the  East Ridge, and on July 24, 1946, by Fritz Gerstaker and Virginia Whitacre made the first ascent of the  West Couloir route. A grade IV, class 5.11 route, known as Technical Knockout, ascends Ruby Wall and features a large roof. It was first climbed by Richard Leversee, Kim Miller and Roanne Miller in July 1989.

References

External links
 

Mountains of Fresno County, California
Mountains of Inyo County, California
Mountains of the John Muir Wilderness
Mountains of Northern California